Peter Fitzgerald-Moore (28 May 1919 – 5 May 2004) was a geologist, environmentalist and political activist.

Education 
He earned a Master's degree from Cambridge University.
He was a member of the Faculty of General Studies at the University of Calgary until 1998 when he retired as an Adjunct Associate Professor.

He was a Senator of the University of Calgary for three years.

Military history
In World War II, he served with the Royal Artillery. He received the Military Cross while serving in Italy as a Forward Observation Officer with the Eighth Indian Division.

Career
He worked for the Royal Dutch Shell companies in various countries for 39 years, after the war. For part of that tenure he worked as Chief Geologist for Shell Canada Ltd.

After retirement, he contracted for the Geological Survey of Canada.

Politics & Activism
He was elected mayor of Bowness, Alberta in 1958.
He was a founding member of the Calgary Eco Centre.
He (co?) founded the Western Affairs Committee.
He was Director of the Pensador Institute.

The trilobite species Pseudodechenella petermoorei ormiston is named for him.

External links
Peter Fitzgerald-Moore's Lectures on Technology and Society at the University of Calgary

Obituary (p.5)
Environmentalists Remembered: Peter Fitzgerald-Moore

1919 births
2004 deaths
20th-century British geologists
British expatriate academics in Canada
British Army personnel of World War II
Academic staff of the University of Calgary
Canadian environmentalists
Mayors of places in Alberta
Academics from London
Royal Artillery officers
Recipients of the Military Cross